Francisco Javier Ramírez Acuña (Jamay, Jalisco, April 22, 1952) is a Mexican politician who belongs to the National Action Party. He has been Municipal President of Guadalajara, Governor of Jalisco from 2001 to 2006 and from December 1, 2006, to January 2008 he served as Secretary of the Interior in the cabinet of President Felipe Calderón.

Political career
Francisco Ramírez Acuña studied at University of Guadalajara, joined the PAN in 1969, and has been a youth leader, member of the state committee, candidate to federal office, and local representative to the Municipal President of Zapopan.

He was a Deputy of Congress for Jalisco twice, and upon joining the government of Jalisco, the governor Alberto Cárdenas Jiménez named him director of the SISTECOZOME, the corporation of collective PAN to mayor of Guadalajara, where he was victorious and held office from 1998 to 2000, when he left to be a candidate for Governor of Jalisco.

In the 2000 elections, he competed against the candidate of the PRI, Jorge Arana Arana, winning by a reduced margin, and was inaugurated on March 1, 2001.

During his time in office as a very unpopular governor of Jalisco, the summit of heads of state and of government of Latin America, the Caribbean and the European Union took place in Guadalajara, in May 2004. During the summit, violent demonstrations of groups -  altermundistas  - occurred in Guadalajara. The destruction of urban property and business took place, including paint splattered in the oldest colonial temples of the city.  In response to these attacks against the summit, the police, responding with riot teams, repressed these demonstrations. According to several versions of the event, there were violations of human rights, which have been accused by Amnesty International and by the National Commission of Human Rights of Mexico (which is linked - according to some, among them business interests - with antagonistic political groups and the secretary of government). The governor of Jalisco was accused of making decisions that resulted in unwarranted arrests, wounds, and cases of torture against the participants in the demonstrations:  "They only took into account the statements in support of globalization, without listening to the motives of the public security forces", assured Ramírez Mints.

The top organizations from the private sector celebrated Acuña's appointment to the Secretary of the Interior of Mexico.

They requested that he be permitted to leave office from the governorship of Jalisco three months before finishing his term, so as to be appointed Secretary of Interior by newly elected Mexican President Felipe Calderón Hinojosa. This would be one of the most controversial appointments to Calderon's cabinet, due to the previously mentioned incident, and also others that had taken place, such as the rejection by the Institutional Revolutionary Party of its appointment to Secretary of Government, and alleged interference in the electoral process by attacking opposing candidates.

According to Javier Oliva, the representative of the PRI before the IFE, Francisco Ramírez Acuña "accused the candidate of the PRI in Jalisco, Arturo Zamora Jiménez (who was opposed to Acuña, and a friend of the Secretary of Government), of crimes", in the 2006 elections. 
Among those promoting the accusations of former candidate Arturo Zamora Jiménez were those alienated by former governor Ramírez Acuña, as the national leader of his party, who did not ask him its opinion and regarding the negative campaign (fits to emphasize was given in the two main edicts this behavior)

On January 16, 2008, Ramírez Acuña resigned as Secretary of the Interior.

In September 2009 he assumed a Proportional Representation deputy for the LXI Legislature, in which he lasted until February 2012.

On April 25, 2012, he was named by the Senate Ambassador of Mexico in Spain and Andorra.

See also
 Governor of Jalisco
 List of mayors of Guadalajara

References

External links
 Secretary of Interior site
 Résumé: The Résumé of the governor in the Governor of Jalisco website
 The biography of Francisco Javier Ramírez Acuña in the PAN official website

1952 births
Living people
Governors of Jalisco
University of Guadalajara alumni
Presidents of the Chamber of Deputies (Mexico)
Municipal presidents of Guadalajara, Jalisco
Members of the Congress of Jalisco
National Action Party (Mexico) politicians
Politicians from Jalisco
Mexican Secretaries of the Interior
Ambassadors of Mexico to Spain
Ambassadors of Mexico to Andorra
20th-century Mexican politicians
21st-century Mexican politicians